There are three villages named Offham in England:
 Offham, East Sussex, near Lewes
 Offham, Kent, near West Malling
 Offham, West Sussex, near Arundel